Young Spirit are a Cree drum group formed in Frog Lake, Alberta in 2001. The band's musical style is traditional Cree round dancing songs, with the group of singers striking hand drums in unison. The group is known for their contemporary take on this traditional and sacred form of music which the Plains Cree received from the Assiniboine in the late 19th century. In 2018, Young Spirit received a Grammy nomination for their album Mewasinsational – Cree Round Dance Songs.

Their album Angel Eagle: Cree Round Dance Songs was a Juno Award nominee for Traditional Indigenous Artist of the Year at the Juno Awards of 2022.

Discography

Studio albums 
 Neechmus: Cree Round Dance (2002)
 It's All About the Drum (2006)
 Save Me a Lead (2013)
 Akameyimoh Baby Boy (2014)
 Niteheochi - "From the Heart" (2014)
 Mewasinsational - Cree Round Dance Songs (2017)
 sâkītohk - "Love Each Other" (2017)
 Love, Life, Round Dance (2019)
 Angel Eagle: Cree Round Dance Songs (2021)

Live albums 
 Takakikeh - Doing it Right (2013)
 Red Dress Special (2018)

References 

First Nations musical groups
Plains Indian music
Musical groups from Alberta